Leuciscus is a genus of fish belonging to the family Cyprinidae. They are inland water fishes commonly called Eurasian daces.  The genus is widespread from Europe to Siberia. Species broadly distributed in Europe include the common dace Leuciscus leuciscus and  the ide L. idus.

The European chubs were formerly also included in Leuciscus, but they are now usually separated in another genus, Squalius (e.g. the chub, Squalius cephalus). The delimitation of Leuciscus and Squalius is not completely resolved; some species have been moved from one genus to the other only in recent years. The genera Petroleuciscus and Telestes have also been split off from Leuciscus  recently; for the latter the same holds true as for Squalius regarding the unclear delimitations.

Species
Currently, 19 recognized species are in this genus:
 Leuciscus aspius (Linnaeus, 1758) (asp)
 Leuciscus baicalensis (Dybowski, 1874) (Siberian dace)
 Leuciscus bearnensis (Blanchard, 1866) (Bearn beaked dace)
 Leuciscus bergi Kashkarov, 1925
 Leuciscus burdigalensis Valenciennes, 1844 (beaked dace)
 Leuciscus chuanchicus (Kessler, 1876)
 Leuciscus danilewskii (Kessler, 1877) (Danilevskii's dace)
 Leuciscus dzungaricus Paepke & F. Koch, 1998
 Leuciscus gaderanus Günther, 1899
 Leuciscus idus (Linnaeus, 1758) (ide)
 Leuciscus latus (Keyserling, 1861)
 Leuciscus lehmanni J. F. Brandt, 1852 (Zeravshan dace)
 Leuciscus leuciscus (Linnaeus, 1758) (common dace)
 Leuciscus lindbergi Zanin & Eremejev, 1934
 Leuciscus merzbacheri (Zugmayer, 1912)
 Leuciscus oxyrrhis (La Blanchère, 1873) (long-snout dace)
 Leuciscus schmidti (Herzenstein, 1896)
 Leuciscus vorax (Heckel, 1843)
 Leuciscus waleckii (Dybowski, 1869) (Amur ide)

References 

 
Cyprinidae genera
Taxa named by Georges Cuvier